The Lycoming DEL-120 is an aircraft diesel engine produced by Lycoming Engines using automotive technology and initially powering unmanned aircraft. Because the DEL-120 is a non-certified engine and is meant for military use only, there is no civil application of this engine.

Applications 
 General Atomics Improved MQ-1C Gray Eagle

Specifications

References

External links 
 Video: A Look at Lycoming’s Diesel Engine – AvWeb

Aircraft diesel engines
Lycoming aircraft engines